The 14th Bombardment Squadron was a squadron of the United States Army Air Forces. The 14th Bomb Squadron fought in the Battle of the Philippines (1941–42), much of its aircraft being destroyed in combat against the Japanese.  The survivors of the ground echelon fought as infantry during Battle of Bataan and after their surrender, were subjected to the Bataan Death March, although some did escape to Australia.  The remainder of the air echelon fought in the Dutch East Indies campaign (1942) before being reassigned to other units.  The squadron was never remanned or equipped.  It was carried as an active unit until April 2, 1946.

History

The squadron operated as a flying training unit, 1917–1918. During the interwar years, it operated from Bolling Field, DC, under the Third Corps Area and the 9th Bombardment Group, 1928–1935. A C-2A transport of the squadron participated as the receiving aircraft ("Question Mark") in a week-long endurance flight testing the practicability of aerial refueling.

World War II
The 19th Bombardment Group had been selected for transfer to the Philippines; however, the need for B-17 bombers there was so urgent that a provisional group already in Hawaii was dispatched to Manila by way of Australia in September. Under the command of Major Emmett O'Donnell Jr., nine B-17s of the 14th Bombardment Squadron (Provisional), the nine crews made up of the cream of the 5th and 11th Bomb Groups, pioneered an air ferry route from Hawaii to the Philippines, leaving on September 5, 1941, and arriving on September 12, 1941, at Clark Field, Philippines. This was the first flight of land-based bombers across the central Pacific. A portion of the flight involved traversing uncharted waters from Wake Island to Port Moresby and Darwin and thence to Fort Stotsenburg, Philippines. They maintained radio silence over the Japanese mandate islands. Successful completion of this historic flight proved that the Philippines could be reinforced by air. For extraordinary achievement in this flight, the airmen of this squadron were awarded the Distinguished Flying Cross. The squadron became part of the Philippine Department Air Force, which subsequently became the Far East Air Force on November 16, 1941, and was attached to the 19th Bombardment Group (Heavy).

On December 8, 1941, the Japanese bombed and strafed Clark Field at 12:00 pm, catching many B-17’s and P-40’s on the ground, which were destroyed.  Sixteen B-17s of the 14th Bombardment Squadron aircraft were based at Del Monte Field and San Marcelino Field and were spared being destroyed. Captain Colin P Kelly Jr, of the 14th Bombardment Squadron attacked the Japanese Navy heavy cruiser Ashigara, thought to be a battleship. Captain Kelly was killed when his B-17 was shot down by Japanese fighters as he was returning to Clark Field, and was posthumously awarded the Distinguished Service Cross (DSC).

The air echelon of the 14th Bombardment Squadron was evacuated to Batchelor Field, Australia on December 24, 1941, while the ground echelon stayed to fight at Clark Field, as infantry in the Philippines as part of the Battle of the Philippines under the command of 5th Interceptor Command.  Orders were soon received from HQ Far East Air Force to move to Java, and the air echelon relocated from Batchelor Field to Singosari Field, Java on December 30, 1941.

The 19th Bombardment Group flew missions from Singosari Field, attacking enemy aircraft, ground installations, warships and transports during the later stages of the Battle of the Philippines and the Dutch East Indies campaign between January–March 1942.  The group earned a total of four United States Presidential Distinguished Unit Citations for actions in the Philippine Islands and Dutch East Indies.  The air echelon of 14th Bombardment Squadron ceased operating from Singosari, Java on March 1, 1942, and began moving to Melbourne, Australia.  Arriving at Essendon Aerodrome, Melbourne on March 4, 1942, the air echelon of 14th Bombardment Squadron began operating from Essendon, Australia.

On March 14, 1942, the air echelon of 14th Bombardment Squadron was detached from the 19th Bombardment Group and ceased operations, with men and equipment transferred to other units. The 14th Bombardment Squadron continued as an active unit in the United States, but was not manned or equipped, and was inactivated on April 2, 1946.

Lineage
 Organized as 1st Aviation School Squadron on May 9, 1917
 Redesignated: 14th Aero Squadron on August 20, 1917 (second formation ("II"), see below)
 Redesignated: Squadron A, Rockwell Field, Calif, on July 23, 1918
 Demobilized on November 23, 1918
 Reconstituted and consolidated (June 8, 1935) with Air Corps Detachment, Bolling Field, DC, which was organized on April 1, 1928
 Redesignated: 14th Bombardment Squadron on March 1, 1935
 Inactivated on September 1, 1936
 Redesignated 14th Bombardment Squadron (Medium) on December 22, 1939
 Activated on February 1, 1940
 Redesignated: 14th Bombardment Squadron (Heavy) on November 20, 1940
 Inactivated on April 2, 1946
 Disbanded on August 19, 1949.

Another 14th Aero Squadron was activated at Kelly Field, Texas, on 14 June 1917.  It was re-designated as the 19th Aero Squadron on 26 June 1917.  Today the USAF 19th Fighter Squadron is heir to the squadron's lineage and honors.

Assignments
 Unknown, 1917–1918
 Office of Chief of Air Corps, April 1, 1928
 Third Corps Area, August 28, 1933
 9th Bombardment Group, March 1, 1935 – September 1, 1936
 11th Bombardment Group, February 1, 1940
 7th Bombardment Group, December 2, 1941 – April 2, 1946
 Attached to 19th Bombardment Group, 2-c. December 24, 1941
 Air echelon attached to 19th Bombardment Group, C. December 24, 1941 – c. March 14, 1942
 Ground echelon attached as infantry to the V Interceptor Command, c. December 24, 1941 – May 1942

Stations
 Rockwell Field, California, May 9, 1917 – November 23, 1918
 Bolling Field, Washington, D.C., April 1, 1928 – September 1, 1936
 Hickam Field, Hawaii Territory, February 1, 1940
 Clark Field, Luzon, Philippines Commonwealth, September 16, 1941
 Bugo, Mindanao, Philippines Commonwealth, (Ground echelon) January 1 – May 1942
 Air echelon operated from: Batchelor Airfield, Australia, c. December 24–c. December 30, 1941
 Air echelon operated from: Singosari Airport, Java, Netherlands East Indies, December 30, 1941–c. March 1, 1942
 Air echelon operated from: Essendon Airport (Melbourne), Australia, c. March 4 – c. March 14, 1942

Aircraft
 JN-4, JN-6, and S-4 during period 1917–1918.
 O-1, 1928 – c. 1930,
 Douglas O-2 and P-1 Hawk, 1928 – c. 1931,
  O-38, 1931–1935,
included, DH-4, A-3, Douglas C-1, C-2, C-4, C-5, C-6, C-9, C-n, Y1C-12, Y1C-17, Y1C-19, Lockheed Y1C-23, C-30 Condor, C-34, O-11, O-13, O-29, O-43, OA-1, PW-9, Boeing P-12, P-26 Peashooter, AT-5, PT-1, BT-2, and apparently YB-9, Martin B-10, C-29 Dolphin, and Thomas-Morse YO-20 during period 1928–1936
 B-18 Bolo, 1940–1941
 B-17 Flying Fortress, 1941
 B-17, and probably B-24 and LB-30, December 7, 1941 – c. March 1, 1942

See also

 List of American Aero Squadrons
 United States Army Air Forces in Australia

Notes

References

 
14th Bomb Squadron

External links

Military units and formations established in 1917
014